Ben Newcomb (born c. 1935) is a former American football and baseball coach.  He served as the head football coach at Augustana College in Rock Island, Illinois from 1969 to 1978, compiling a record of 55–34–1.  Newcomb was also the head baseball coach at Eastern Illinois University for one season, in 1966, tallying a mark of 9–17.  Newcomb graduated from Augustana College—now known as Augustana University—in Sioux Falls, South Dakota.  He coached in the public schools in Sioux Falls before moving to Eastern Illinois.  Newcomb resigned as head football coach at Augustana following the 1978 season to become director of the school's College Center.

Head coaching record

Football

References

1930s births
Year of birth missing (living people)
Living people
Augustana (Illinois) Vikings football coaches
Augustana (South Dakota) Vikings football players
Eastern Illinois Panthers baseball coaches
Eastern Illinois Panthers football coaches
Sportspeople from Sioux Falls, South Dakota
Players of American football from South Dakota